Buyin may refer to:
 Buyin, an alternate name of Buin Zahra, a city in Iran
 Buyin, Zanjan, a village in Zanjan Province, Iran
 BUYIN, a procurement joint-venture by Deutsche Telekom and Orange
 "Buy-in", a poker term, see: Glossary of poker terms#buy-in
 The purchase of a company by a new manager or management team, see Management buy-in